Panaca may refer to:

In the United States
 Panaca, Nevada, an unincorporated town in Lincoln County
 Panaca Summit Archeological District, near the above community
 Panaca Formation, a geologic formation in Nevada
Elsewhere
 PANACA, or (Spanish: Parque Nacional De La Cultura Agropecuaria), a Colombian theme park
 Panaca Palace, a palatial residence in the Portuguese capital of Lisbon

See also
 Panakas, in Inca culture, a family formed by all the descendants of a monarch